Heinrich Ludolph (Ludwig) Wendland (29 April 1791, in Hanover – 15 July 1869, in Teplice) was a botanist who authored a number of Acacia species.

Heinrich Wendland was born on 29 April 1791 into a family well known in botany.  His father Johann had published a number of botanical books including the notable "Botanische Beobachtungen nebst einigen neuen Gattungen und Arten". Heinrich studied in Göttingen after some years of apprenticeship in Vienna and London. He became a gartenmeister in 1827 and later was director of Herrenhausen Gardens at Herrenhausen, today part of Hanover.  In 1820 he published "Commentatio de Acacias aphyllii", in which he authored a number of new Acacia species.  He died in Teplice, Bohemia on 15 July 1869.

Works
 Commentatio de Acacias aphyllii, 1820.
Heinrich Ludolph authored a number of species, including:
 Acacia browniana H.L.Wendl.
 Acacia cochlearis (Labill.) H.L.Wendl.Rigid Wattle
 Acacia saligna (Labill.) H.L.Wendl.Coojong
 Acacia willdenowiana H.L.Wendl.Grass Wattle
 Buddleja glomerata H.L.Wendl. Karoo Sagewood

External links

References

1791 births
1869 deaths
Scientists from Hanover
University of Göttingen alumni
19th-century German botanists